is a train station of West Japan Railway Company (JR-West) in Kashihara, Nara, Japan. Although it is on the Sakurai Line as rail infrastructure, its passenger train services have been provided by the Man-yō Mahoroba Line since 2010. The station is a transfer point to Yagi-nishiguchi Station on the Kintetsu Kashihara Line.

Lines
  JR-West
  Man-yō Mahoroba Line

Layout

Platforms

Surroundings
 Yamato-Yagi Station
 Yagi-nishiguchi Station
 Ofusa Kannon
 Imai-chō
 Nara Medical University

External links
 Official website 

Railway stations in Japan opened in 1898
Railway stations in Nara Prefecture